Sirk is a village and municipality in Revúca District in the Banská Bystrica Region of Slovakia.

References

External links
http://sirk.e-obce.sk

Villages and municipalities in Revúca District